Jennifer "Jen" Leigh is a news anchor for WFLA-TV in Tampa, Florida where she anchors weeknights at 5, 5:30, 7 & 11pm. She has been with WFLA-TV since 1993.

Early life and college
Leigh was born in Miami, Florida but grew up in Lakeland, Florida. She is the oldest of seven children. She graduated Cum Laude from the University of South Florida with a bachelor’s degree in Mass Communications in 1994.

Career
Leigh joined WFLA-TV as an intern and later was hired as an assignment editor at while still a USF student in 1993. Two years later, she launched News Channel 8’s Polk County bureau and became a full-time reporter there. She served as a weekend anchor, morning fill-in anchor and evening fill-in anchor. She became the 7 p.m. anchor in 2012. She replaced Gayle Sierens first at the 11 PM News in 2014 and then at 5 PM when Sierens retired the following year.

References

External links
Jen Leigh's bio at WFLA

Living people
American television reporters and correspondents
People from Lakeland, Florida
Year of birth missing (living people)